Ashley (formerly known as Ashley HomeStore and still known as Ashley Furniture HomeStore in some countries) is an American furniture store chain that sells Ashley Furniture products. Opened in 1997, the chain comprises over 2000 locations worldwide. The chain has both corporate and independently licensed and operated furniture stores.

History
The first Ashley Furniture HomeStore opened in Anchorage, Alaska in 1997. Since then, the company has become the #1 home furniture retailer in North America. It has stores located throughout the United States, Canada, Chile, Mexico, Puerto Rico, Egypt, Central America, Japan, India, Turkey, Singapore, Saudi Arabia, Pakistan, Kazakhstan, Armenia, Georgia, Ukraine, Mongolia, Kuwait, Cambodia, Vietnam and Bangladesh.

The 100th HomeStore store opened in 2003, the 200th in 2005. It became the fastest-growing furniture chain and top-selling furniture brand worldwide in 2006 and opened its 300th store in 2007.

At the time when Jennifer Convertibles filed for Chapter 11 bankruptcy protection in July 2010, Ashley Furniture HomeStore was listed as having a $1.4 million claim against Jennifer. When Jennifer emerged from bankruptcy in February 2011, it controlled six Ashley Furniture HomeStores in the New York City area.

In February 2014, Ashley Furniture HomeStore opened its 500th store in Longview, Texas. As of 2022 there are over 1000 Ashley HomeStore locations across the globe.

In April 2015, Ashley Furniture HomeStore made its first incursion in South America by opening its first store in Punta Arenas, Chile.

Ashley Furniture Industries
The parent company of Ashley, Ashley Furniture Industries, headquartered in Arcadia, Wisconsin, is the world's largest home furniture manufacturer. Owned by father and son team, Ron and Todd R. Wanek, the company manufactures and distributes home furnishings throughout the globe. The company employs more than 18,000. In 2013, the company built a 3.8 million square foot manufacturing and distribution complex in Advance, North Carolina.

Charity 
Ashley HomeStore has raised over $6 million for St. Jude Children's Research Hospital. The company hosts the annual Midwest Ashley HomeStore for the Arts, whose proceeds go towards children's charities, school and other different humanitarian initiatives. Most Ashley HomeStore locations also support the Hope to Dream foundation which donates mattresses to kids aged 6-16 that do not have one.

Celebrity spokespersons 
In 2015, Ashley Furniture HomeStore signed up reality TV stars Bill and Giuliana Rancic to represent the brand in advertisements and events around the U.S. “A lot of people don’t have a point of view on what they want in their home,” son of Ashley Furniture founder Ron Wanek, Todd Wanek said. “We want to figure it out for them.” It is believed that Ashley Furniture parted ways with the couple after a public outcry against Giuliana's criticism of another celebrity, Zendaya.

References

External links

USA Website
Canada Website
Ashley Furniture Store Howell

Franchises
Furniture retailers of the United States
Arcadia, Wisconsin
Retail companies established in 1997
Privately held companies based in Wisconsin
American companies established in 1997
1997 establishments in Alaska
Retail companies based in Wisconsin